Francisco Ezequiel Ladogana (born August 12, 1988 in La Plata) is an Argentinian football midfielder.

References

Living people
1988 births
Argentine footballers
Argentine expatriate footballers
Association football forwards
Expatriate footballers in El Salvador
C.D. Suchitepéquez players
Deportivo Pereira footballers
Footballers from La Plata